Agh Bolagh-e Mostafa Khan (also Romanized as Āgh Bolāgh-e Moşţafá Khān; also known as Āgh Bolāgh) is a village in Vilkij-e Markazi Rural District, Vilkij District, Namin County, Ardabil Province, Iran. At the 2006 census, its population was 624, in 140 families.

References 

Towns and villages in Namin County